The 12th ALMA Awards honored the accomplishments made by Hispanics in film, television, and music in 2010. This ceremony marked the return of the ALMA Awards after being cancelled the prior year and the first of two consecutive years the show aired on NBC after having previously aired on ABC for 9 years.

The ceremony was held on September 10, 2011, at the Santa Monica Civic Auditorium. The awards were hosted by George Lopez and Eva Longoria, with musical performances by Pitbull, Demi Lovato and Gloria Estefan.

Winners and nominees
The following is a list of the nominees from film, television, and music. Winners are listed first and highlighted in bold:

Honorary awards

Raymond Telles received the Outstanding Career Achievement – Documentarian Award.
Cynthia Cidre received the Outstanding Career Achievement – Writer Award.
Gregory Nava received the Outstanding Career Achievement – Director Award.
The Harvest received the Special Achievement Award.
AltaMed Health Services Corporation received the 2011 Pepsico Alma Adelante Award.

Film

Television

Music

References

External links
Official website for the ALMA awards

012
2011 awards
Latin American film awards